The Irish Country Novels are an ongoing series of historical fiction books written by Patrick Taylor and published by Forge Books. The first book in the series, An Irish Country Doctor, was originally published as The Apprenticeship of Doctor Laverty by Insomniac Press in 2004 and was short listed for the BC Book awards fiction prize 2005.

An Irish Country Doctor became a New York Times bestseller upon its republication in 2007 and was named Book of the Month Club's Novel of the Month in March 2007. It has been translated into thirteen other languages. 

Several sequels in the series have also become international bestsellers, particularly in Canada, where Taylor has resided since 1970. When An Irish Country Christmas appeared in mass market paperback in 2010 it reached No 17 on the New York Times and 86 on the USA Today bestseller lists. 

Set in Ballybucklebo, a fictional village in rural Northern Ireland, the series follows novice doctor Barry Laverty as he begins his assistantship at the practice of Dr. Fingal Flahertie O'Reilly.  The sixth and eighth books of the series, A Dublin Student Doctor and Fingal O'Reilly, Irish Doctor, explore the life of Dr. O'Reilly prior to the events of An Irish Country Doctor.

Bibliography

Novels
The Apprenticeship of Doctor Laverty, 2000; published in the U.S. as An Irish Country Doctor, 2007
An Irish Country Village, 2008
An Irish Country Christmas, 2008
An Irish Country Girl, 2010
An Irish Country Courtship, 2010
A Dublin Student Doctor, 2011
An Irish Country Wedding, 2012
Fingal O'Reilly, Irish Doctor, 2013
An Irish Doctor in Peace and at War, 2014
An Irish Doctor in Love and at Sea, 2015
An Irish Country Love Story, 2016
An Irish Country Practice, 2017
An Irish Country Cottage, 2018
An Irish Country Family, 2019
An Irish Country Welcome, 2020
An Irish Country Yuletide, 2021

Short Stories

Home is the Sailor, 2013
The Wily O'Reilly: Irish Country Stories, 2014

Other 

 An Irish Country Cookbook, 2017 (includes ten short stories)

References

Historical novels by series
Novels from Northern Ireland